"Get Your Shine On" is the third single released from Jesse McCartney's debut album Beautiful Soul in Australia and New Zealand. "Because You Live" was released as the third single in North America and Europe. It peaked at #34 on the Australian ARIA Singles Chart. The song was featured in the 2004 film Fat Albert, the 2005 Disney film Kim Possible Movie: So the Drama,  the 2005 Disney live action film Ice Princess and the CBS hit sitcom Two and a Half Men.

The song was featured on an episode of America's Funniest Home Videos (dated January 6, 2008) in a montage of Karate Mishaps.

An uncredited review in Brio & Beyond said that McCartney "oohs and aahs over a girl while encouraging her to dance more provocatively."

Formats and track listings
"Get Your Shine On" (Single Version) – 3:12
"She's No You" (Neptunes Remix) - 3:05

Charts

References

Jesse McCartney songs
2005 singles
Songs written by Jesse McCartney
Songs written by Matthew Gerrard
Songs written by Robbie Nevil
Hollywood Records singles
2004 songs
Song recordings produced by Matthew Gerrard